The Daily Journal is an American, English language daily newspaper headquartered in Fergus Falls, Otter Tail County, Minnesota.  It was founded in 1873.  Publishing Tuesday through Saturday, it is one of 24 newspapers currently published at least five days a week in the state of Minnesota.

History
The Daily Journal was founded by A. J. Underwood.  His family published the newspaper until the mid-1980s. It was then purchased by Thompson Newspapers in December 1992, later to Boone Newspapers, Inc., until 2019 when it was purchased by Wick Communications. The history of The Daily Journal predecessors includes the following newspapers:
 Fergus Falls Daily Journal. (Fergus Falls, Minn.) 1883-1972
 Fergus Falls Daily Telegram. (Fergus Falls, Minn.) 1882-1885
 Fergus Falls Weekly Telegram. (Fergus Falls, Minn.) 1882-1885
 Fergus Falls Independent. (Fergus Falls, Otter Tail Co., Minn.) 1881-1883
 The Fergus Falls Journal. (The Fergus Falls, Minn.) 1873-1881

References

Daily Journal
Daily Journal
Daily Journal
Daily Journal